Wild West is a 1992 British comedy film directed by David Attwood and starring Naveen Andrews.

Cast
Naveen Andrews as Zaf
Ravi Kapoor as Ali
Ronny Jhutti as Kay
Sarita Choudhury as Rifat
Lalita Ahmed as Mrs. Ayub

Reception
The film has a 43% rating on Rotten Tomatoes.  Roger Ebert awarded the film two stars.

References

External links
 
 

British comedy films
1992 comedy films
1992 films
Films directed by David Attwood (film director)
1990s English-language films
1990s British films